Tidermène is a village and cercle in Ménaka Region of southeastern Mali. In the 2009 census it had a population of 5,816. Its area is approximately 29,000 square kilometers. It was previously a commune in Ménaka Cercle but was promoted to the status of a cercle when Ménaka Region was implemented in 2016. From 2001 to 2016 the commune of Alata was separated from Tidermène.

References

External links
.
.

Populated places in Ménaka Region
Cercles of Mali